Jorge Melício (Lobito, 20 March 1957) is a Portuguese sculptor. He was born in Angola in 1957 and has lived in Lisbon since he was seven years of age.

Biography
He went to Escola de Artes Decorativas António Arroio ("António Arroio School of Decorative Arts") and Escola Superior de Belas-Artes de Lisboa ("University of Arts of Lisbon").

Artworks

In the 1970s he made clay and stone sculptures in the Freguesia of Pêro Pinheiro.

His works are held in numerous museums and private collections. He has a painting in the A Brasileira, Chiado. His public sculptures are found around Portugal. Examples are the "Família" in Fernando Pessoa Garden, near the Lisbon city hall, and the recent ceramic monument dedicated  to the life and work of Queen Saint Elizabeth of Portugal, at the headquarters of the Caixa Geral de Depósitos bank in the same city. The administration of the Lisbon metropolitan railway selected him to decorate one of its stations.

Prizes

Bronze Medal from the Diogo Gonçalves Museum (Portimão)
Prize: Design ICS Para Embalagens (Milan)
Silver Medal  (Castelo Branco)

See also

Hyperrealism, a genre of painting and sculpture
Bronze sculpture, the use of bronze for artistic representations
Bronzing, a process by which an object is coated in bronze

References
Interview with Jorge Melício on 28-10-2007, channel RTP Africa
Rui Unas' interview with Jorge Melício in the show "Cabaret da Coxa" , channel Sic Radical

External links
The Official Page of the Artist
Erotic Feelings – Melício's hyperrealistic drawings on people and their senses
Melício at Garden Gulbenkian (Portuguese)
Mother with Child, a fictional study of Melicio's sculpture

Portuguese sculptors
Male sculptors
Portuguese artists
Living people
1957 births